Mariana Pajón Londoño ODB OLY (born 10 October 1991) is a Colombian cyclist, two-time Olympic gold medalist and BMX World Champion.

She won her first national title at age of 5 and her first world title at 9. Overall, she is the winner of 14 world championships, 2 national championships in the United States, 9 Latin American Championships and 10  Pan American championships. She also won the gold medal at the 2012 Summer Olympics in London, on 10 August 2012, as well as in the 2016 Summer Olympics in Rio. She is the first Colombian to win two Olympic gold medals. Pajón's achievements in BMX have earned her the nickname "Queen of BMX".

Named Colombian Athlete of the Year in 2011, a BMX circuit built in Medellin was named for her, and was the venue where she won the 2016 BMX World Championships.

She was selected to be the flag-bearer for Colombia at the 2012 Summer Olympics at the Opening Ceremony.

BMX Olympic champion

London 2012 
After being the flag-bearer for Colombia during the Opening Ceremony of the 2012 Summer Olympics, Pajón's first participation in the BMX event resulted in the first gold medal for Colombia during the 2012 games and the second overall in Colombia's participation in the Olympics.

After achieving a splendid 1st position in all three runs of the Semifinals, Pajón won with a time of 37.706 seconds during the final.

Rio 2016 

In the 2016 Olympic Games Pajón defended her title and won her second Olympic gold medal and fifth overall for Colombia. With this victory, Pajón became the first Colombian athlete to win two gold medals.

Tokyo 2020 

In the 2020 Summer Olympics Pajón won silver.

Personal life 
Mariana Pajón Londoño was born in Medellín, Colombia, on 10 October 1991, daughter of Carlos Mario Pajón and Claudia Londoño, who were also athletes in their youth (her father practiced motoring and her mother riding). She studied at the Sacred Heart Montemayor Catholic school in Rionegro, near to Medellín.

Mariana learned to ride a bicycle when she was three years old. When she was four she began to perform her first training on the track, and had her first race, in which she competed against children of five and six years-of-age since there was no suitable category.

She was invited to the Youth Camp held during the 2008 Beijing Olympics. On 1 June 2008, Mariana won the UCI BMX World Championship 2008, held in Taiyuan, China, in Junior Women's Cruiser category.

Pajón married fellow BMX rider Vincent Pelluard on 16 December 2017 after dating for 4 years. Pelluard acquired Colombian citizenship through his marriage with Pajón and now represents Colombia on the international scene.

She was award the Colombian Order of Boyacá.

Awards

Olympics 
 London 2012
 Olympic gold medal, Women's BMX
 Rio de Janeiro 2016
 Olympic gold medal, Women's BMX (First Colombian to achieve 2 gold medals at the Olympic Games)
 Tokyo 2020
 Olympic silver medal, Women's BMX

Pan American Games 
 Guadalajara 2011
 Pan American Gold Medal, Women's BMX
 Lima 2019
 Pan American Gold Medal, Women's BMX

World Championships 
 Taiyuan 2008
  World Champion, Junior Women Cruiser
 Adelaide 2009
  World Champion, Junior Women 
  World Champion, Junior Women Cruiser
 Pietermaritzburg 2010
  World Champion, Elite Women Cruiser
 Copenhagen 2011
  World Champion, Elite Women
  Bronze Medal, Elite Women's Time Trial
 Birmingham 2012
 Fifth position, Elite Women
 Auckland 2013
  Gold Medal, Elite Women's Time Trial
 Rotterdam 2014
  World Champion, Elite Women
  Bronze Medal, Elite Women's Time Trial
 Medellín 2016
  World Champion, Elite Women
  Bronze Medal, Elite Women's Time Trial
 Rock Hill 2017
  Bronze Medal, Elite Women

References

External links 

 
 
 
 
 

1991 births
Living people
BMX riders
Colombian female cyclists
Olympic cyclists of Colombia
Olympic gold medalists for Colombia
Olympic silver medalists for Colombia
Olympic medalists in cycling
Cyclists at the 2012 Summer Olympics
Cyclists at the 2016 Summer Olympics
Cyclists at the 2020 Summer Olympics
Medalists at the 2012 Summer Olympics
Medalists at the 2016 Summer Olympics
Medalists at the 2020 Summer Olympics
Pan American Games gold medalists for Colombia
Pan American Games medalists in cycling
Cyclists at the 2011 Pan American Games
Cyclists at the 2015 Pan American Games
Cyclists at the 2019 Pan American Games
Medalists at the 2011 Pan American Games
Medalists at the 2019 Pan American Games
South American Games gold medalists for Colombia
South American Games medalists in cycling
Competitors at the 2010 South American Games
UCI BMX World Champions (elite women)
Sportspeople from Medellín
21st-century Colombian women
Competitors at the 2010 Central American and Caribbean Games
Competitors at the 2014 Central American and Caribbean Games